José Gómez Mustelier a.k.a. Jovani Gomez  (born January 28, 1959 in Colombia, Cuba) is a retired Cuban boxer, who won the middleweight gold medal at the 1980 Summer Olympics. In the final he defeated Viktor Savchenko of the USSR on points (4–1). Two years earlier he captured the world title at the second World Championships in Belgrade, followed by the gold medal at the 1979 Pan American Games.

Olympic results
Defeated Enock Chama (Zambia) 3–2
Defeated Jang Bong-mun (North Korea) KO 2
Defeated Valentin Silaghi (Romania) 5–0
Defeated Viktor Savchenko (USSR) 4–1

References

1959 births
Living people
People from Colombia, Cuba
Middleweight boxers
Boxers at the 1980 Summer Olympics
Olympic boxers of Cuba
Olympic gold medalists for Cuba
Olympic medalists in boxing
Medalists at the 1980 Summer Olympics
Boxers at the 1979 Pan American Games
Pan American Games gold medalists for Cuba
Cuban male boxers
AIBA World Boxing Championships medalists
Pan American Games medalists in boxing
Medalists at the 1979 Pan American Games
20th-century Cuban people